Ragnarok (released in Europe as Valhalla) is a freeware Roguelike video game for MS-DOS®, developed by Norsehelm Productions (Thomas F. Boyd and Rob Vawter) from 1992 to 1995.

Plot
Ragnarok is based on Norse mythology, with many of the gods, realms, items, and quests drawing directly from it, such as:

 Thor, god of thunder
 Jormundgand, god, the world serpent
 Loki, god, mischievous troublemaker
 Balder, fair god murdered by Loki
 Hela, god, queen of Niflheim
 Mjölnir, Thor's hammer
 Gungnir, Odin's spear
 Mimming, Freyr's sword
 Gall, Heimdall's Horn
 Skidbladnir, a boat belonging to the gods
 Ravens, benevolent monsters, messengers of Odin
 Nidhogg, monster, a dragon-like being who chews on the roots of Yggdrasil
 Dwarves, monsters, mythological smiths
 Giants, monsters, Ymir's kin
 Midgard, location, realm of men
 Niflheim, location, realm of the dead

Gameplay
Ragnarok has multiple features uncommon amongst roguelike games, such as a graphical interface, a historical or mythological setting, set quests, the ability to change classes, and the ability to permanently change one's race via polymorphing.

Character development 
Character development is one of the main focuses of Ragnarok. Throughout the game, the player may change forms, to obtain the powers and abilities of almost any monster in the game, except for god and demigod-level creatures. The player can also modify their own body, changing the number of fingers and eyes, and the gender of the character. The player also has the option of changing their class every ten levels, which allows you to gain power, skills, abilities, and permanent status effects. 

Forms of character development in-game include:

 Scroll of Knowledge – grants the player one active ability. 
 Eating a dead body – there are many creatures in the game that when killed and eaten, give you a variety of different passive abilities, and in a few rare cases cause transformation.
 Wand of  Polymorph – casts a random transformation, meaning the player can become any creature in the game, including weak monsters such as rats, who cannot carry a proper inventory or wield weaponry. 
 Potion of Transformation – similar to the Wand of Polymorph, but made with the use of the Alchemy skill. 
 Lycanthropy,  passed on by werewolf attacks.

Class system 

At the beginning of the game, the player must choose from one of six character classes, all of which have varying intrinsic statistics. At level ten, the player "masters" a class, and gains all the skills that the class can use. The player can then choose a new class, or continue as the old class for another ten levels.  Classes include:

 Viking – a  physically strong character who gains the weapon master ability. Weapon mastery allows the player to do maximum damage with all weapons, and gives the player a free second turn from time to time.
 Blacksmith – a physically powerful character who gains the ability to work metals into weapons and armor. The blacksmith is able to forge The Runesword, a powerful, one-of-a-kind weapon.
 Woodsman – a moderately powerful character, who learns to make arrows from trees, tame lesser (beast) monsters, to swim, and to terraform the terrain.
 Conjurer – a physically weak character who learns to cast spells. In addition to using spells like the touch of death, the conjurer is able to teleport, and funnel charges from one wand to another.
 Alchemist – a physically weak character who learns to mix potions. A master alchemist is able to make the Potion of Second Life, which as the name suggests, brings the player back to life as soon as he is killed.
 Sage – a physically weak character who learns to write scrolls. A master sage can write a powerful, one-of-a-kind Switch Bodies scroll.

After the player has mastered  every class, their class matters much less.

Ghosts
One element of Ragnarok  gameplay is that slain player characters leave behind 'ghost data' for the next adventurer to encounter. This data includes the slain adventurer's inventory (minus a few rare items) and the map state as it was at the time of death, including all opponents. From time to time such ghosts present a play challenge, such as might be the case in 'choke point' maps where a  player cannot advance due to the large number of ghosts in the area.

Quests
The game consists  of six quests based on Norse mythology. They are:

 Free Balder's soul.
 Locate and return Mjölnir to Thor.
 Locate and return Gjallarhorn to Heimdall.
 Locate and return Mimming to Freyr.
 Locate and return Gungnir to Odin.
 Find a manner for Tyr to fight with one hand.

External links 
 Ragnarok (Valhalla) article by Theodor Lauppert

1992 video games
Freeware games
Roguelike video games
DOS games
DOS-only games
Video games based on Norse mythology
Video games set in the Viking Age
Video games developed in the United States
Ymir